Ireland was represented by The Swarbriggs Plus Two, with the song "It's Nice to Be in Love Again", at the 1977 Eurovision Song Contest, which took place on 7 May in London. "It's Nice to Be in Love Again" was chosen as the Irish entry at the national final on 20 February.

Jimmy and Tommy Swarbrigg had previously represented Ireland in 1975, and were joined on this occasion by Alma Carroll and Nicola Kerr.

Before Eurovision

National final 
The final was held at the studios of broadcaster RTÉ in Dublin, hosted by Mike Murphy. Eight songs took part, with the winner chosen by voting from ten regional juries. Other participants included past and future Irish representatives Dickie Rock (1966) and Colm C. T. Wilkinson (1978), while future Eurovision winner Linda Martin performed as a member of the group Chips.

At Eurovision 
On the night of the final the group performed first in the running order, preceding Monaco. Pre-contest betting rated Ireland as one of the front runners, along with the entries from Belgium, Germany and the United Kingdom. At the close of voting "It's Nice to Be in Love Again" had picked up 119 points, placing Ireland third of the 18 entries, the country's best placement since Dana's victory seven years earlier. The song had gained four maximum 12s – from Israel, Norway, Sweden and the United Kingdom – with only Finland failing to award it any points at all. It was therefore somewhat ironic that the Irish jury awarded its 12 points to Finland.

Voting

References 

1977
Countries in the Eurovision Song Contest 1977
Eurovision
Eurovision